ICFF, the International Contemporary Furniture Fair, has been recognized as North America’s leading platform for global design. The ICFF welcomes over 600 international exhibitors, both established brands and emerging designers, showcasing what’s next and what’s best for contemporary, design driven residential and commercial interiors. The ICFF is held at the Javits Center in New York City each May and is managed by Emerald Expositions.

References

External links
Official Website

Annual fairs
Furniture